This is a list of incidents that happened on the island of Ireland (encompassing what exists today as the Republic of Ireland and Northern Ireland) and are commonly called massacres. All those that took place during the late 20th century were part of the Troubles.

References

Ireland
Ireland history-related lists
 
Lists of disasters in Ireland